Gustavo Herrera Grau (Caracas, 12 April 1890 – Caracas, 1 February 1953), was a Venezuelan lawyer and diplomat. He served as Finance Minister in 1936, Plenipotentiary Minister of Venezuela in Netherlands and Germany, acting head of the Ministry of Foreign Affairs, Minister of Education, and Minister of Development in various presidential administrations. He was the Minister of Finance in 1936.

See also 
Foreign relations of Venezuela

References 

 Biography at Venezuelatuya.com
 Biography of the Foreign Affairs Ministry
“Dictionary of History of Venezuela”, Polar Foundation, 1997.

1890 births
1953 deaths
People from Caracas
Venezuelan diplomats
20th-century Venezuelan lawyers
Venezuelan Ministers of Foreign Affairs
Finance ministers of Venezuela
Central University of Venezuela alumni
Academic staff of the Central University of Venezuela